Typhoon Nock-ten, known in the Philippines as Typhoon Nina, was the strongest Christmas Day tropical cyclone worldwide in terms of 1-minute sustained winds. Forming as a tropical depression southeast of Yap and strengthening into the twenty-sixth tropical storm of the annual typhoon season on December 21, 2016, Nock-ten intensified into the thirteenth typhoon of the season on December 23. Soon afterwards, the system underwent explosive intensification and became a Category 5-equivalent super typhoon early on December 25. Nock-ten weakened shortly afterwards before making eight landfalls over the Philippines. The typhoon weakened rapidly due to the landfalls as it entered the South China Sea on December 26, turned southwest, and ultimately dissipated on December 28 due to the winter monsoon. 

Nock-ten was the third typhoon to have caused significant impacts in the Philippines, after typhoons Sarika and Haima only two months prior, both of which struck similar areas at a similar intensity. 13 people were known to have been killed by Nock-ten. Damage totals were estimated upwards of US$127.5 million, and because of this, the names Nock-ten and Nina were retired by the Japan Meteorological Agency and PAGASA name lists, respectively.

Meteorological history

The broad and poorly organized system was being affected by moderate to high vertical wind shear, which was being offset by warm sea surface temperatures.
Soon, the JTWC upgraded the system to a tropical depression, with the designation of 30W, based on improved environmental conditions and an ASCAT image. Late on the same day, when central convection was increasing and consolidating over a defined low-level circulation center (LLCC), both the JMA and the JTWC upgraded it to a tropical storm, with the former assigning the name Nock-ten. One day later, late on December 22, the JMA upgraded the system to a severe tropical storm, and Nock-ten started to form an eye revealed by microwave imagery.

Tracking west-northwestward and then westward along the southern periphery of a deep-layered subtropical ridge, Nock-ten intensified into a typhoon at noon UTC on December 23. Immediately after that, explosive intensification commenced with a sharp eye embedded in a symmetric central dense overcast feature. At 06:00 UTC on December 24, Nock-ten reached its peak intensity with estimated ten-minute maximum sustained winds of 195 km/h (120 mph) and the central pressure at 915 hPa (27.02 inHg); therefore, it was the latest-forming typhoon of such intensity or stronger on record. The JTWC also upgraded Nock-ten to a Category 4-equivalent super typhoon, when the system was in an area of low vertical wind shear, excellent dual-channel outflow, and sea surface temperatures of 29 ºC. Although the eye became cloud-filled in the afternoon, it cleared again late on the same day and while the JMA did not raise its intensity estimate further, the JTWC did so.

On December 25, the JTWC reported that the Dvorak technique analyses at 03:00 UTC from "all reporting agencies" indicated a T-number of 7.0; therefore, the JTWC added a non-synoptic entry to the operational best track for that time, indicating one-minute maximum sustained winds of 260 km/h (160 mph), equivalent to Category 5 on the Saffir–Simpson scale. However, land interaction soon impacted the typhoon, as its convective cloud tops had become warmer. Later, Nock-ten made landfall over the Philippines eight times: Bato, Catanduanes at 18:30 PST (10:30 UTC) and Sagñay, Camarines Sur at 21:30 PST (13:30 UTC) on December 25; San Andres, Quezon at 02:00 PST (18:00 UTC), Torrijos, Marinduque at 04:30 PST (20:30 UTC), Verde Island, Batangas at 09:15 PST (01:15 UTC), Tingloy, Batangas at 10:10 PST (02:10 UTC), Calatagan, Batangas at 11:40 PST (03:40 UTC), and Lubang Island, Occidental Mindoro at 13:00 PST (05:00 UTC) on December 26.

The eight landfalls significantly eroded Nock-ten, and the structure became much more asymmetric and ragged. Thus, when Nock-ten emerged into the South China Sea early on December 26, it had weakened into a minimal typhoon. Subsequently, although Nock-ten's structure briefly improved, it was downgraded to a severe tropical storm by the JMA and a tropical storm by the JTWC early on December 27, as its LLCC had started to become exposed. Poleward outflow was no longer offsetting the effects of strong vertical wind shear, leading to rapid weakening. After the JMA downgraded the system to a tropical storm at 09:00 UTC, Nock-ten further weakened to a tropical depression late on the same day. Influenced by a Northeast Monsoon surge, the system accelerated southwestward, and convection was unable to develop over the fully exposed LLCC due to high vertical wind shear and colder dry air. The JTWC issued its final warning for the system early on December 28, and the tropical depression dissipated in the afternoon.

Preparations and impact

Nock-ten made eight landfalls in the Philippines. According to the NDRRMC, a total of 98,771 families were preemptively evacuated in CALABARZON, MIMAROPA, Bicol, and Eastern Visayas region.

A total of 13 people have been reported dead while total damages have been reported up to ₱6.12 billion (US$123 million).

On December, 26, 2016, MV Starlite Atlantic sank off the coast of Tingloy, Batangas during the onslaught of the typhoon. The vessel was anchored in Batangas Bay when the typhoon passed over it with winds of up to 185 km/h in the center and gusts of 215 km/h. The typhoon generated huge waves between six to eight meters in height, causing the vessel to come off its mooring and drift toward Tingloy where it sank. One person died and 18 were reported missing in the incident, while the Philippine Coast Guard rescued 15 out of the 34 crew.

Highest Public Storm Warning Signal

Retirement

PAGASA announced that Nina had removed from their naming lists, because it had caused over ₱1 billion in damages; subsequently on January 17, 2017, PAGASA announced that they selected Nika to supersede Nina for the 2020 season. On the other hand, during the 49th annual session of the ESCAP/WMO Typhoon Committee during 2017, they announced that the Nock-ten had also removed from the naming lists. In March 2018, the Typhoon Committee officially chose Hinnamnor as its replacement name.

See also

Typhoon Goni (2020) – the strongest storm to ever make landfall in world history, also struck the town of Bato, Catanduanes
Typhoon Lee (1981) – late-season typhoon which caused destruction in Mindanao
Typhoon Durian (2006) – caused similar destruction to the same areas affected by Nock-ten
Typhoon Rammasun (2014) – typhoon which hit Bicol Region and Metro Manila in July 2014
Typhoon Hagupit (2014) – took a similar track
Typhoon Melor (2015) – previous typhoon to directly affect Southern Luzon and Bicol prior to Nock-ten
Typhoon Tembin (2017) – another late-season storm that struck the Philippines in December 2017
Typhoon Kammuri (2019) – another typhoon which hit Bicol and Southern Luzon in December 2019
Cyclone Tracy (1974) – a tropical cyclone that struck Darwin, Northern Territory on Christmas Day, causing devastation.
Typhoon Phanfone (2019) – a typhoon which affected the Philippines on the same holiday.
Typhoon Rai (2021) – the first category 5 equivalent typhoon in the month of December since Nock-ten.

References

External links

JMA Best Track Data of Typhoon Nock-ten (1626) 
30W.NOCK-TEN from the U.S. Naval Research Laboratory

2016 disasters in the Philippines
2016 Pacific typhoon season
December 2016 events in Asia
Typhoons in the Philippines
Nock-ten